Betsy L. Close (born May 4, 1950) is a Republican politician who served in the Oregon State Senate. Close was sworn into office in October 2012, replacing Frank Morse, who retired before his term ended. Prior to serving as Senator, Close served four terms as state representative and taught in Albany, Oregon, and Washington state.

In October 2013 she announced she would run for a full term.  In the November 2014 election, Close was defeated by Democrat Sara Gelser.

References

External links
 Senate website

1950 births
Living people
21st-century American politicians
21st-century American women politicians
American women educators
Educators from Oregon
Republican Party members of the Oregon House of Representatives
Republican Party Oregon state senators
People from Albany, Oregon
People from Shelton, Washington
Women state legislators in Oregon